Héctor Pablo Bidoglio (born 5 February 1968) is a football manager and former player who played as a midfielder for Venezuela national football team. Currently, he is the technical director of a Malaysia Super League club Johor Darul Ta'zim.

Born in Argentina, Bidoglio made a total number of 17 appearances for the Venezuela national team between 1999 and 2000.

Honours

Manager
Johor Darul Ta'zim
 Malaysia Super League: 2022
 Malaysia Cup: 2022
 Malaysia FA Cup: 2022

References

External links
 
 
 Interview in which Bidoglio speaks about his starting career in Newell's Old Boys
 “Buenos” Vinotintos Penquistas

1968 births
Living people
Footballers from Rosario, Santa Fe
Argentine emigrants to Venezuela
Association football midfielders
Argentine footballers
Venezuelan footballers
Venezuela international footballers
1999 Copa América players
Newell's Old Boys footballers
C.D. Arturo Fernández Vial footballers
Deportes Concepción (Chile) footballers
Minervén S.C. players
Caracas FC players
Deportivo Italia players
Trujillanos FC players
Deportivo Táchira F.C. players
Al-Arabi SC (Qatar) players
A.C.C.D. Mineros de Guayana players
Zulia F.C. players
Estudiantes de Mérida players
Venezuelan expatriate footballers
Expatriate footballers in Chile
Expatriate footballers in Qatar
Expatriate footballers in Argentina
Expatriate footballers in Venezuela
Argentine expatriate sportspeople in Chile
Argentine expatriate sportspeople in Venezuela
Qatar Stars League players
Newell's Old Boys managers
Argentine football managers
S.D. Aucas managers
Argentine expatriate sportspeople in Ecuador
Expatriate footballers in Ecuador
Universidad San Martín managers